is a former Japanese football player.

Playing career
Matsuda was born in Misato on August 14, 1974. After graduating from high school, he joined his local club Urawa Reds in 1993. However he could not play at all in the match in 2 seasons. In 1995, he moved to Japan Football League club Tosu Futures (later Sagan Tosu). He played many matches as defender and the club was promoted to J2 League in 1999. His opportunity to play decreased in 2002 and he retired end of 2002 season.

Club statistics

References

External links

1974 births
Living people
Association football people from Saitama Prefecture
Japanese footballers
J1 League players
J2 League players
Japan Football League (1992–1998) players
Urawa Red Diamonds players
Sagan Tosu players
Association football defenders